Lady Rollo was launched at Calcutta in 1810. She was a country ship, trading east of the Cape of Good Hope, primarily between Calcutta and the islands of the Malay Archipelago, such as Java. 

The crew were unable to get her off and she bilged and was lost. Her crew took to her boat and Captain Sinclair, the supercargo, set her on fire. On 20 September they reached Bima where the Rajah declined to assist them. A local Chinese merchant who provided them with a proa. They arrived at Bisuki on 12 October.

Citations and references

Citations

References
 
 

1810 ships
British ships built in India
Age of Sail merchant ships of England
Maritime incidents in 1813